Joseph Lennon (22 June 1933 – 25 January 1990) was a Fine Gael politician from County Louth in Ireland. He was a senator from 1982 to 1987.

A farmer and local councillor in County Louth, Lennon stood unsuccessfully as a Fine Gael candidate for Dáil Éireann in the Louth constituency at the 1977 and 1987 general elections.

In 1982, he was elected to the 16th Seanad Éireann on the Agricultural Panel, and was re-elected in 1983 to the 17th Seanad, serving until 1987 elections.

References

1933 births
1990 deaths
Fine Gael senators
Members of the 16th Seanad
Members of the 17th Seanad
Local councillors in County Louth
Irish farmers
Politicians from County Louth